James R. Shreve (August 27, 1926 – December 29, 2018) was American football, basketball, and lacrosse coach. He served as the head coach at Moravian College in Bethlehem, Pennsylvania from 1951 to 1954, compiling a record of 10–20–1. Shrive also served as an assistant coach at Syracuse University where he was a member of the school's 1959 national championship staff. He also served as the head coach for Syracuse freshman football team, then called theTangerines.

Raised in Scotch Plains, New Jersey, Shreve graduated from Scotch Plains-Fanwood High School in 1945.

Head coaching record

College football

References

External links
 

1926 births
2018 deaths
American football defensive backs
Basketball coaches from New Jersey
Basketball players from New Jersey
Cornell Big Red football coaches
George Washington Colonials baseball coaches
George Washington Colonials football coaches
High school football coaches in Pennsylvania
Iowa State Cyclones football coaches
Lehigh Mountain Hawks football coaches
Lehigh Mountain Hawks men's lacrosse coaches
Moravian Greyhounds football coaches
People from Scotch Plains, New Jersey
Players of American football from New Jersey
Scotch Plains-Fanwood High School alumni
Sportspeople from Plainfield, New Jersey
Syracuse Orange football coaches
Syracuse Orange football players
Syracuse Orange men's basketball players